The Dien Sanh train crash occurred on 10 March 2015 when a passenger train struck a lorry obstructing the line on a level crossing near Dien Sanh station, Quảng Trị Province, Vietnam. One person was killed and four were seriously injured.

Accident
At 22:15 local time (15:15 UTC), a Hanoi to Ho Chi Minh City passenger train, callsign SE5, collided with a lorry on a level crossing near Dien Sanh station in Quảng Trị Province. The crossing carried National Route 1 across the North–South Railway. The train consisted of D19E locomotive №968 and fourteen carriages. The locomotive and three carriages derailed, killing the train driver and seriously injuring four other people, including the lorry driver. Several more were reported to have been injured; they were taken to Quảng Trị General Hospital. The train was carrying roughly 600 passengers. Clearance of the line began at 02:10 on 11 March. (19:10 on 10 March UTC). Damage was estimated at VND 23 billion (US$1.1 million). The locomotive was destroyed, two carriages and a dining car were damaged. Over  of track was destroyed. After the recovery operation, a railway crane derailed. The railway was reopened at 20:55 (13:55 UTC) on 11 March.

See also
List of level crossing accidents

References

2015 disasters in Vietnam
Level crossing incidents in Vietnam
Quảng Trị province
Railway accidents in 2015
Transport in Vietnam